Balwaan is a 1992 Indian Hindi-language action film directed by Deepak Anand and produced by Raju Mavani. The film starring Sunil Shetty in his debut role, with Divya Bharti, Tinu Anand, Danny Denzongpa in pivotal roles.

Plot 
Arjun Singh comes from a poor family. He lives in a small and shabby tenement with his mother and sister. He was studying in college where he falls in love with beautiful Deepa. One day he attacks a corrupt Police Officer and gets sent to prison for that. Deepa bails him from jail with the help of her father Police Commissioner Raj Sahni. Deepa's father wants Arjun to join the police force as he feels that the department needs some honest officers. He joins the police force and gets posted to another city where the original Police Inspector was killed by the goons. He goes to the city along with his mother and sister. This puts him into conflict with a notorious gangster Bhaiji. In order to teach Arjun a lesson, Bhaiji orders people in this community to stop interacting with Arjun and his family, as a result the three are alienated. His sister and his mother passes away. Then Bhaiji has Arjun captured and chained, but Arjun manages to escape, only to find that he has been framed for murder and is arrested by the police.

Cast
Sunil Shetty as Inspector Arjun Singh
Divya Bharti as Deepa Sahni
Tinu Anand as Police Commissioner Raj Sahni
Danny Denzongpa as Bhaiji
Ishrat Ali as Minister
Arun Bakshi as Inspector Tanya Palok
Anjana Mumtaz as Arjun's mother
Avtar Gill as ACP
Vikram Gokhale as Police Inspector
Neena Gupta as Ratna
Pankaj Berry as Pankaj
Guddi Maruti as Radha
Raju Shrestha as Mukesh
Kim as Dancer / Singer

Production
Suniel Shetty's debut film Balwaan 1992 some shooting in Surat,Gujarat.Pandesara area colourtex dyeing mill and,kapadia health club,hotel shiv.This time location help Ashvin Borad member of film crafts federation.

Soundtrack

References

External links 
 

1992 films
1990s Hindi-language films
1992 action films
Indian romantic action films